Donskoy (masculine), Donskaya (feminine), or Donskoye (neuter) may refer to:
Donskoy (surname)
Donskoy District, a district of Southern Administrative Okrug, Moscow, Russia
Donskoy (inhabited locality) (Donskaya, Donskoye), several inhabited localities in Russia
Donskoy Monastery, a major male monastery in Moscow, Russia
Donskoye Cemetery
Donskoye (air base), an air base in Kaliningrad Oblast, Russia
Donskoy cat, a breed of mostly hairless cat

See also
Dmitry Donskoy (disambiguation)